The Division of Chifley is an Australian electoral division in the state of New South Wales.

Chifley is located in outer western Sydney. It includes Rooty Hill, Doonside, Woodcroft, Dean Park, parts of Marayong and Blacktown, and all the suburbs of the Mt Druitt housing estate.

History

The division was created in 1969 and is named for Ben Chifley, who was Prime Minister of Australia 1945–49.

Chifley has been won by the Labor Party at every federal election since its creation in 1969, and at the 2007 federal election was one of Labor's safest seats. The Member for Chifley, since the 2010 federal election, is Ed Husic, a member of the Australian Labor Party.

Boundaries
Since 1984, federal electoral division boundaries in Australia have been determined at redistributions by a redistribution committee appointed by the Australian Electoral Commission. Redistributions occur for the boundaries of divisions in a particular state, and they occur every seven years, or sooner if a state's representation entitlement changes or when divisions of a state are malapportioned.

The division is located in the western suburbs of Sydney. On its original boundaries it was based on Blacktown, but now includes the suburbs of Angus, Bidwill, Blackett, Bungarribee, Colebee, Dean Park, Dharruk, Doonside, Emerton, Glendenning, Hassall Grove, Hebersham, Lethbridge Park, Marayong, Marsden Park, Melonba, Mount Druitt, Nirimba Fields, Oakhurst, Plumpton, Richards, Rooty Hill, Ropes Crossing, Shalvey, Shanes Park, Tregear, Whalan, Willmot, and Woodcroft; as well as parts of Arndell Park, Blacktown, Eastern Creek, Huntingwood, Quakers Hill, Riverstone, and Schofields.

Demographics 
Chifley is home to immigrant communities from the Philippines, India, and Fiji, and is heavily Catholic at 30.8% with a larger-than-average Muslim population at 8.3%. Some voters are socially conservative, particularly those of religious background.

The current MP is Ed Husic, a member of the Australian Labor Party. Husic himself comes from a Bosnian Muslim family, but describes himself as non-practising Muslim.

Members

Election results

References

External links
 Division of Chifley – Australian Electoral Commission

Electoral divisions of Australia
Constituencies established in 1969
1969 establishments in Australia